Arsalan Iftikhar (born September 1, 1977) is an American human rights lawyer, global media commentator and author of the book SCAPEGOATS: How Islamophobia Helps Our Enemies & Threatens Our Freedoms which President Jimmy Carter called “an important book that shows Islamophobia must be addressed urgently.”

Arsalan is founder of TheMuslimGuy.com and serves as senior editor for The Islamic Monthly magazine. He has also served as a faculty member at Georgetown University’s Edmund A. Walsh School of Foreign Service where he wrote about Islamophobia as a Senior Fellow for The Bridge Initiative. Iftikhar is also a national advisory board member for the John C. Danforth Center for Religion & Politics at Washington University in St. Louis. He has also been an adjunct professor of religious studies at DePaul University and is a member of the Asian American Journalists Association (AAJA) and Reporters Without Borders.

He also won the 2013 Distinguished Young Alumni Award from Washington University School of Law.

In May 2011, Arsalan was named one of the top 12 Muslim Twitter accounts in the world by The Huffington Post,  and he was also a featured interview for a December 2012 ABC News documentary called "Back to the Beginning" by Christiane Amanpour, on the shared origins of the major world religions today.

Biography
Arsalan Iftikhar is an international human rights lawyer of Pakistani descent and founder of TheMuslimGuy.com and Senior Editor for The Islamic Monthly magazine.

For over seven years, Arsalan was a regular weekly contributor on the Barbershop segment for the  National Public Radio (NPR) show Tell Me More with Michel Martin.  Arsalan was also the former National Legal Director of the Council on American Islamic Relations (CAIR) during the George W. Bush administration. Arsalan also currently works as a consultant at Cook Ross, Inc, a Washington DC consulting firm specializing in organizational development, leadership development, and diversity & inclusion issues.

Arsalan's interviews, commentaries and analyses have regularly appeared in virtually every major media outlet in the world including: CNN, BBC World News, Al-Jazeera English, The TODAY Show, National Public Radio (NPR), Fox News, MSNBC, Associated Press, C-SPAN, Voice of America (VOA), Agence France-Presse (AFP), USA TODAY, NBC Nightly News, The Washington Post, ABC World News Tonight, Los Angeles Times, CBS News, The New York Times, Rolling Stone, TIME, Newsweek, The Economist & ABC News "NIGHTLINE" and Meet The Press on NBC News (and many more worldwide).

His opinion columns have appeared in major publications such as: CNN.com, USA Today, Houston Chronicle, Detroit Free Press, The Providence Journal, San Diego Union-Tribune, The Charlotte Observer, St. Louis Post-Dispatch, Kansas City Star, Miami Herald and Esquire Magazine (Middle East edition).

In March 2008, Arsalan was one of four international debaters selected to participate in The Doha Debates on BBC World Television. The Doha Debates are broadcast to over 300 million people worldwide on BBC World TV and its stage has been shared with the likes of Nobel Peace Prize winner Archbishop Desmond Tutu and former United States President Bill Clinton.  Arsalan and his debate partner argued for the motion: "This House believes that Muslims are failing to do enough to combat extremism." (He and his partner won the debate.)

In addition to The Doha Debates, some of Arsalan’s other international speaking venues have included: Harvard University, Stanford University, Georgetown University, Mount Holyoke College, Washington University in St. Louis, Johns Hopkins University, University of Pennsylvania, George Washington University Elliott School of International Affairs, University of Michigan School of Law, The Rockefeller Foundation, the Organization for Security and Co-operation in Europe (OSCE), The British Museum in London and The Aspen ideas Festival.

Additionally, Arsalan was cast as a movie extra in the Warner Brothers spy movie thriller Body of Lies (October 2008) starring Leonardo DiCaprio and Russell Crowe. Arsalan was also a contributing author to Taking Back Islam (Rodale Press), winner of the 2003 Wilbur Communications Award for Religion Book of the Year. In 2006, the French Ambassador to the United States personally selected Arsalan for the Personnalites d’Avenir (Personalities of the Future) World Leader Program in Paris sponsored by the French Foreign Ministry.

Arsalan graduated from Washington University in St. Louis in 1999 and received his Juris Doctor degree from Washington University School of Law in 2003. A native of Chicago, he specializes in international human rights law and is licensed to practice law in Washington DC.

Divorced from his first wife (m. July 2008), Iftikhar remarried in 2015. He and his second wife divide their time between Chicago and Washington, DC.

Controversy 
On January 19, 2015, Iftikhar said on MSNBC that Louisiana governor Bobby Jindal "might be trying to, you know, scrub some of the brown off his skin as he runs to the right in a Republican presidential exploratory bid."  Iftikhar said this in reference to Jindal's statements about supposed Muslim "no-go zones" in Europe.

References

External links

 Official personal website
 Arsalan on BBC Doha Debates
 Christian Science Monitor Article on Arsalan on September 11, 2008
 Arsalan's YouTube Channel.

1977 births
Living people
American people of Pakistani descent
American Muslim pacifists
American lawyers
People from Norfolk, Virginia
Washington University in St. Louis alumni
Washington University School of Law alumni